This is a list of Australian Army aviation units. The Australian Army Aviation Corps was formed in 1968, initially with the assistance of the RAAF. These units have been utilised in a variety of roles including surveillance, reconnaissance and utility / transport, and have operated a variety of helicopters and fixed wing aircraft. More recently Unmanned Aerial Vehicles (UAVs) have been introduced into service and are operated by the Royal Australian Artillery.

Units

Joint Army-RAAF units
No. 16 Air Observation Post Flight RAAF (RAAF unit with large Army component formed in 1953, absorbed into the 16th Army Light Aircraft Squadron)
1st Army Aviation Company (comprised pilots only flying charted civilian aircraft formed in 1957, absorbed into the 16th Army Light Aircraft Squadron)
No. 16 Army Light Aircraft Squadron  (joint Army / RAAF unit formed in 1960, became the 1st Aviation Regiment)

Army aviation regiments and brigades
16th Aviation Brigade (non-flying headquarters)
1st Aviation Regiment
161st Squadron
162nd Squadron
5th Aviation Regiment
A Squadron
B Squadron
C Squadron
6th Aviation Regiment
171st Special Operations Aviation Squadron
173rd Aviation Squadron

Independent Army aviation flights and squadrons
161st Independent Reconnaissance Flight (formed in 1965 and served in Vietnam, later became part of the 1st Aviation Regiment)
183rd Independent Reconnaissance Flight (Papua & New Guinea) (Formed at RAAF Amberley in 1968 and deployed to Lae PNG to replace a Detachment of two C180 aircraft based at Port Moresby since 1965. A mixed fixed and rotary wing unit it was disbanded in 1976 after PNG gained independence)

Units operating UAVs
20th Surveillance and Target Acquisition Regiment, Royal Australian Artillery

Training units
Australian Army Aviation Training Centre
Australian School of Army Aviation
Australian Army Helicopter School
Australian Defence Force Helicopter School

See also
List of Royal Australian Air Force aircraft squadrons
List of Australian Fleet Air Arm flying squadrons

Notes
Footnotes

Citations

References

External links
History of Australian Army Aviation

 
Army Aviation
Australian Army aviation units